Samuel Wesley Calvert (September 16, 1867 – March 11, 1956) was a soldier and politician. He served as mayor of Chipman, Alberta, and as a member of the Legislative Assembly of Alberta from 1935 to 1940 sitting with the Social Credit caucus in government.

Early life
Calvert went overseas to fight in World War I. He saw combat action as a member of the 19th Alberta Dragoons.

Political career
Calvert began his political career by serving as Mayor of Chipman, Alberta.

Calvert ran for a seat in the legislature in the 1935 Alberta general election as a Social Credit candidate in the electoral district of Victoria. He defeated three other candidates with a large majority to pick up the seat for his party.

Calvert did not run for a second term and retired at dissolution of the assembly in 1940.

References

External links
Alberta Legislature Membership Listing

Alberta Social Credit Party MLAs
Canadian military personnel of World War I
Mayors of places in Alberta
1867 births
1956 deaths